2000 World Championships may refer to:

 Alpine skiing: Alpine World Ski Championships 2000
 Aquatics: 2000 World Aquatics Championships
 Athletics: 2000 World Championships in Athletics
Cross-country running: 2000 IAAF World Cross Country Championships
Road running: 2000 IAAF World Road Running Championships
 Badminton: 2000 BWF World Championships
 Bandy: Bandy World Championship 2000
 Biathlon: Biathlon World Championships 2000
 Boxing: 2000 World Amateur Boxing Championships
 Chess: FIDE World Chess Championship 2000
 Curling:
 2000 World Men's Curling Championship
 2000 World Women's Curling Championship
 Darts: 2000 BDO World Darts Championship
 Darts: 2000 PDC World Darts Championship
 Figure skating: 2000 World Figure Skating Championships
 Football: 2000 FIFA Club World Championship
 Futsal: 2000 FIFA Futsal World Championship
 Beach soccer: 2000 Beach Soccer World Championship
 Ice hockey: 2000 Men's World Ice Hockey Championships
 Ice hockey: 2000 IIHF Women's World Championship
 Netball: 2000 Netball World Championships
 Nordic skiing: FIS Nordic World Ski Championships 2000
 Speed skating:
Allround: 2000 World Allround Speed Skating Championships
Sprint: 2000 World Sprint Speed Skating Championships
Single distances: 2000 World Single Distance Speed Skating Championships

See also
 2000 World Cup (disambiguation)
 2000 Continental Championships (disambiguation)
 2000 World Junior Championships (disambiguation)